Buck Pond is a small lake north of the hamlet of Keepawa in Herkimer County, New York. It drains southeast via an unnamed creek that flows into Alder Creek.

See also
 List of lakes in New York

References 

Lakes of New York (state)
Lakes of Herkimer County, New York